Plakohypaphorines are halogenated indolic non-proteinogenic amino acids named for their similarity to hypaphorine (N,N,N-trimethyltryptophan). First reported in the Caribbean sponge Plakortis simplex in 2003,  plakohypaphorines A-C were the first iodine-containing indoles to be discovered in nature. Plakohypaphorines D-F, also found in P. simplex, were reported in 2004 by a group including the researchers who discovered the original plakohypaphorines.

References

Taglialatela-Scafati Orazio et al., 2003. Plakohypaphorines A-C, Iodine-Containing Alkaloids from the Caribbean  Sponge Plakortis simplex. European Journal of Organic Chemistry. 2003(2), pp. 284–287.
Borrelli, Francesca, et al., 2004. Iodinated Indole Alkaloids From Plakortis simplex, New Plakohypaphorines and an Evaluation of Their Antihistamine Activity. European Journal of Organic Chemistry. 2004(15), pp. 3227–3232.

Non-proteinogenic amino acids
Halogen-containing alkaloids
Organoiodides
Zwitterions